Ryan Pace (born February 17, 1977) is an American sports executive in the National Football League (NFL). He served as the general manager of the Chicago Bears from 2015 to 2021. Before that, he worked in the New Orleans Saints' front office for 14 years.

College career
Pace played linebacker at Edward S. Marcus High School before committing to Eastern Illinois in 1995; he had also received offers from Illinois State, North Texas, Texas State, and Western Illinois. EIU offensive line coach and recruiting coordinator Clancy Barone praised Pace for his speed and athleticism, saying he "showed good toughness on film."

At EIU, he converted to defensive end and played for the Panthers from 1996 to 1999.

Professional career
After not gaining any opportunities as a player, Pace was hired by the New Orleans Saints in 2001 as a coaching intern. Six years later, Pace became the director of pro personnel, and in 2013, became the director of player personnel. Pace was an executive in New Orleans during the team’s most successful stretch in franchise history which included 5 playoff appearances, 2 NFC Championship Appearances and a Super Bowl Win.

In 2015, Pace was offered an interview for the general manager position by the New York Jets, but declined. He was later interviewed by the Chicago Bears for the general manager position on January 7, and was hired the next day. At 37 years of age at the time of his hiring, Pace was the youngest general manager in the NFL. To replace the fired Marc Trestman, Pace hired John Fox as the Bears' head coach. After a 3–13 season in 2016 that gave the Bears the third-overall pick in the 2017 NFL Draft, Pace moved up a spot in a trade with the San Francisco 49ers to draft quarterback Mitchell Trubisky. Trubisky was the franchise's highest draft pick since 1951 and the highest it has ever taken a quarterback. In Pace's first three years and the stretch of Fox's tenure, the Bears went 14–34, leading to Fox's firing after the 2017 season.

After Fox's firing, Pace hired Matt Nagy as Chicago's next head coach in 2018. Before the season, the Bears traded their 2019 and 2020 1st round draft picks for star Oakland Raiders outside linebacker Khalil Mack and Oakland Raider’s 2020 2nd round draft pick and made him the highest-paid defensive player in NFL history.  That year, the Bears went 12–4 to win the NFC North for the first time since 2010, while Eddie Jackson and Tarik Cohen, two fourth-round picks Pace made in 2017, were named All-Pro. Trubisky was named to the Pro Bowl as well. The Bears had 8 players participate in the Pro Bowl following the 2018 season.  Pace was eventually named Executive of the Year by the Sporting News, becoming the third Bears general manager to win the award after George Halas in 1956 and Michael McCaskey in 1985.

The Bears had the 20th overall pick in the 2021 Draft. Pace moved up 9 spots in the first round in a trade with the New York Giants to select quarterback Justin Fields.  

In Pace and Nagy's four-year tenure, together the Bears made the playoffs two of four seasons, with 2018-2020 being the first time the Chicago Bears had a three year stretch of 2 playoff appearances and zero losing seasons since the 1980’s. However, 2021 saw the Bears regress to a 6–11 record. On January 10, 2022, Pace, along with Nagy, were fired by the Bears. After his firing, Pace released a statement of gratitude that described the news as "the tough part" of his occupation but he was "proud to have poured absolutely everything into making the Chicago Bears a better football team every single day".

On February 23, 2022, Pace was hired by the Atlanta Falcons as a senior personnel executive. The move reunited him with Falcons general manager Terry Fontenot, with whom he worked in New Orleans.

Personal life
The son of Michael Pace and Ginger Phillips, Pace grew up in Flower Mound, Texas which is a suburb of Dallas. His grandfather Buck was a minor league baseball player.

He and his wife Stephanie have one daughter together.

References

External links
 Chicago Bears bio

Chicago Bears executives
Living people
People from Flower Mound, Texas
National Football League general managers
Players of American football from Texas
Eastern Illinois Panthers football players
1977 births